Edward Douglas Cowart (February 17, 1925 – August 3, 1987) was an American judge who served as a Dade County Circuit Court Judge.

Early life and education
Before entering the judiciary, Cowart served as a Miami police officer. He sat on the bench for 14 years, earning wide respect among Florida lawyers. He was known for frequent biblical quotations in the courtroom. Cowart received his Bachelor of Arts at the University of Miami in 1950 and his Juris Doctor from Stetson University College of Law in 1952.

Bundy trial
Cowart is best known as the presiding judge at the trial of serial killer Ted Bundy, a one-time law student who was arrested for a series of murders from at least 1974 to 1978 and who represented himself in court. Cowart imposed a death sentence, and is remembered for his sympathetic post-sentencing remarks to Bundy:

Death
Cowart died of a heart attack at the age of 62. Bundy was executed two years later in 1989 after failing in numerous appeals to Cowart and the Court of Appeals, seeking to overturn his sentence or be granted a new trial.

References

1925 births
1987 deaths
20th-century American judges
University of Miami alumni
American municipal police officers
Florida state court judges
Florida lawyers
Stetson University College of Law alumni
People from Miami-Dade County, Florida
People from Tampa, Florida